Shelly Manne & His Friends is a jazz album by drummer Shelly Manne with pianist André Previn and bassist Leroy Vinnegar recorded in 1956 and released on the Contemporary label.

Reception

The AllMusic review by Scott Yanow states: "This initial release from the group, as with all of the later sets, is really a showcase for the remarkable piano playing of Previn who was not even 27 yet but already had a dozen years of major league experience behind him".

Track listing
 "Tangerine" (Victor Schertzinger, Johnny Mercer) - 4:25 		
 "I Cover the Waterfront" (Johnny Green, Edward Heyman) - 6:10
 "Squatty Roo" (Johnny Hodges) - 7:58
 "Collard Greens and Black-Eyed Peas" (Oscar Pettiford) - 7:57
 "Stars Fell on Alabama" (Frank Perkins, Mitchell Parish) - 4:42
 "The Girl Friend" (Richard Rodgers, Lorenz Hart) - 5:20

Personnel
Shelly Manne - drums
André Previn - piano
Leroy Vinnegar - bass

References

1956 albums
Contemporary Records albums
Shelly Manne albums